Hiatus may refer to:

Hiatus (anatomy), a natural fissure in a structure
Hiatus (stratigraphy), a discontinuity in the age of strata in stratigraphy
Hiatus, a genus of picture-winged flies with sole member species Hiatus fulvipes
Global warming hiatus, relating to trends in global temperatures as measured at earth's surface
Vowel hiatus, a sequence of two syllables with no consonant in the middle

Film and television
"Hiatus" (30 Rock), first-season finale episode of 30 Rock
"Hiatus", an episode of NCIS
Hiatus (television), a break of several weeks or more in television scheduling
Hiatus (production), a routine break of television and movie production in the latter half of December

Music
Hiatus (band), a Belgian crustcore band
The Hiatus, a Japanese rock band
"Hiatus", a song from the Asking Alexandria album Stand Up and Scream

Latin words and phrases